Sonia Anguelova Hirt is a professor of Landscape Architecture and Planning and dean in the College of Environment + Design at the University of Georgia.

Academic career
After training as an architect at the University of Architecture, Civil Engineering and Geodesy in her hometown of Sofia, Hirt earned masters (1995) and doctoral (2003) degrees from the Alfred Taubman College of Architecture and Urban Planning at the University of Michigan, Ann Arbor. In 2003 she became an assistant professor at the University of Toledo College of Languages, Literature and Social Sciences, and moved the next year to another assistant professorship at Virginia Tech's College of Architecture and Urban Studies. In 2011 she served as a visiting professor at the Harvard Graduate School of Design. In 2016 she was named dean of the School of Architecture, Planning and Preservation at the University of Maryland, College Park, replacing David Cronrath. Her most recent appointment is at the University of Georgia in 2018 as the Hughes Professor in Landscape Architecture and Planning. With Nicholas Dagen Bloom she is editor of the Journal of Planning History.

Hirt's work attempts to explain why houses in the U.S. are so large relative to other industrialized nations. "People intuitively often think that this is the explanation … because America is such a big country. Well, this is true, but Russia is a big country. Kazakhstan is a big country. Space itself doesn’t really make people do one thing or another." She rebuts President Trump's message to immigrants that "Our country is full", saying "Factually speaking, the country is not actually full — that’s impossible. The real question is, if you continue on the current path of immigration, does this bring more benefits than it brings costs?" She also notes the unusual preponderance of single-family zoning: "I could find no evidence in other countries that this particular form — the detached single-family home — is routinely, as in the United States, considered to be so incompatible with all other types of urbanization as to warrant a legally defined district all its own, a district where all other major land uses and building types are outlawed."

Awards
Zoned in the USA: The Origins and Implications of American Land-Use Regulation won the biennial John Friedmann Book Award from the Association of Collegiate Schools of Planning, and an honorable mention for the 2015 Best Book in Urban Affairs Award from the Urban Affairs Association. Iron Curtains: Gates, Suburbs and Privatization of Space in the Post-Socialist City received a 2014 honorable mention from Harvard's Davis Center for Russian and Eurasian studies for "outstanding monograph published on Russia, Eurasia, or Eastern Europe in anthropology, political science, sociology, or geography".

Selected publications

References

External links
 Sonia Hirt - College of Environment + Design, University of Georgia

Living people
Bulgarian women academics
American women academics
University of Georgia faculty
Year of birth missing (living people)
21st-century American women